Říčany is a town in Prague-East District in the Central Bohemian Region of the Czech Republic. It has about 16,000 inhabitants. The town is part of the Prague metropolitan area.

According to the Quality of Life Index, which has been comparing the standard of living in the cities and towns of the Czech Republic since 2018, the town is rated the best place to live in the country in all years.

Administrative parts
The villages of Jažlovice, Krabošice, Kuří, Pacov, Radošovice, Strašín, and Voděrádky are administrative parts of Říčany.

Geography
It lies on the Říčanský Stream, which supplies several small fish ponds. The western part of the municipal territory is located in the Prague Plateau and the eastern part in the Benešov Uplands.

History
According to Czech Chronicle of Wenceslaus Hajek, Říčany existed already in 748. The first trustworthy written mention of the settlement is from 1289. A large castle was built here in 1260–1270, but during the Hussite Wars it was conquered and abandoned, and in the 16th century, it became a ruin.

Říčany experienced a decline after the Thirty Years' War. After the construction of Prague – Vienna railway in 1869, the town began to prosper and develop again. Luxury villas began to be built, and Říčany became a popular recreational location.

Demographics

Culture
 Starák – multicultural festival (beginning of August)
 Říčanský nos – town festival (beginning of September)

Education
There are three primary schools in Říčany. The "First primary school" is located in the centre of the town, on Masarykovo Square. The "Second primary school" is located in the upper part of Říčany, Radošovice and the "Third primary school" is located on the south-east border of Říčany next to Oliva Children's Medical Institution. There are also two secondary schools: the state school Gymnázium Říčany and the private Masarykovo klasické gymnázium.

Sights

The early Gothic Říčany Castle was one of the oldest stone castles in the Czech Republic. The ruins are freely accessible.

The Church of Saints Peter and Paul and the town hall from 1864 are the landmarks of Masarykovo Square. The church was originally a Gothic building from around 1270. After it was destroyed during the Thirty Years' War, it was rebuilt in the Baroque style in 1719. The Marian column on the town square, with a gilded statue of the Virgin Mary Immaculate, dates from 1699. It is a simplified copy of the column that stood on the Old Town Square in Prague.

Jureček lido in Radošovice was founded in the 1920s. Due to its age and atmosphere, it is among the most popular swimming pools in the region.

Twin towns – sister cities

Říčany is twinned with:

 Albertslund, Denmark
 Borken, Germany
 Dainville, France
 Grabow, Germany
 Mölndal, Sweden
 Opatówek, Poland
 Whitstable, England, United Kingdom

References

External links

Cities and towns in the Czech Republic
Populated places in Prague-East District